Reinwardtoena is a small genus of doves in the family Columbidae. They are found on parts of Indonesia, Papua New Guinea and the Solomon Islands.

The genus was introduced by the French naturalist Charles Lucien Bonaparte in 1854 with the great cuckoo-dove (Reinwardtoena reinwardti) as the type species. The name commemorates the German naturalist Caspar Georg Carl Reinwardt.

The genus contains three species:
 Great cuckoo-dove, Reinwardtoena reinwardti
 Pied cuckoo-dove, Reinwardtoena browni
 Crested cuckoo-dove, Reinwardtoena crassirostris

References

 
Bird genera
 
Taxa named by Charles Lucien Bonaparte